Same-sex marriage in Chile has been legal since 10 March 2022. In June 2021, the President of Chile, Sebastián Piñera, announced that his government would sponsor a bill to legalize same-sex marriage. The Senate of Chile passed the legislation on 21 July 2021, and the Chamber of Deputies gave its approval on 23 November 2021. Disagreements on some aspects of the bill led to the formation of a mixed commission to discuss it. Both chambers of the National Congress approved an identical version of the bill on 7 December 2021. President Piñera signed the legislation into law on 9 December, and it was published in the Diario Oficial de la República de Chile on 10 December. The law took effect 90 days later, with the first same-sex marriages taking place on 10 March 2022.

Chile had previously recognized same-sex couples in the form of civil unions only. Civil unions, known as acuerdo de unión civil (AUC) in Spanish, are offered to all couples regardless of sexual orientation, providing some, but not all, of the rights of marriage. The first civil unions were registered on 22 October 2015.

Civil unions

Bachelet's first presidency 
In the January 2006 presidential campaign, both major candidates, center-left Michelle Bachelet and center-right Sebastián Piñera, voiced their support for civil unions, but the Catholic Church and many members of National Congress were opposed.

In October 2009, a civil union bill was introduced in the National Congress but failed to pass.

Piñera's first presidency 

During his run-up to the presidency in 2009, Piñera vowed to end discrimination based on sexual orientation and included a same-sex couple in one of his televised campaign ads.

In June 2010, Senator Andrés Allamand (National Renewal) submitted a bill to Congress to permit a "common life agreement", which would have been open to both different-sex and same-sex couples. On 3 August 2010, Senator Fulvio Rossi (Socialist Party) introduced a bill to legalize same-sex marriage in the country. During the first week of September 2010, several senators backing the bill stated they would withdraw their support after talks with members of the Evangelical Church, and instead announced support for the civil union bill introduced by Senator Allamand.

In May 2011, President Piñera said he was in favor of an upcoming bill to legalize a form of civil union; his stated intent was to "protect and safeguard [...] the dignity of those couples, whether of the opposite or even the same sex". Piñera introduced a bill to Congress in August 2011 allowing registered cohabitation, known as Acuerdo de Vida en Pareja ("Life Partnership Agreement"). This would give unmarried partners many of the rights granted only to married couples, such as inheritance and certain social welfare and health care benefits. Under Piñera's legislation, same-sex couples would be able to register their civil partnership with a notary.

On 10 April 2013, the civil union bill was approved by the Senate's Constitution, Law and Justice Committee on a 4–1 vote. On 7 January 2014, the Senate voted 28–6 in favor of the law, but the bill was not voted on by the Chamber of Deputies before the end of the parliamentary session in March 2014, despite it being a priority issue for Piñera.

Bachelet's second presidency
When Michelle Bachelet again took office as president in March 2014, she made passing Piñera's civil union bill a priority. On 5 August 2014, a Senate committee approved the civil union bill. On 7 October 2014, the bill was passed by the Senate, and moved to the Chamber of Deputies.

The name of the bill was changed to Civil Union Pact on December 17, and Congress reiterated its intention to hold the final vote by January 2015. On 6 January 2015, a provision recognizing foreign marriages as civil unions was approved in the Constitutional Committee while a clause recognizing adoption rights was rejected. As the bill was amended, it went to a final vote in both the Senate and the Chamber of Deputies. On 13 January, the Chamber of Deputies reinserted the adoption provision. On 20 January 2015, the Chamber approved the bill on a vote of 86 to 23 with 2 abstentions. On 27 January, the Senate rejected all the Chamber's amendments, so the bill was sent to a joint committee of both houses. The committee reached an agreement with regards to the text of the bill and changed the name to Civil Union Agreement the same day. The bill was passed in both houses on 28 January 2015. Several lawmakers asked the Constitutional Court to verify the bill's constitutionality, which was upheld by the court in a ruling released on 6 April 2015. The bill was signed into law by President Bachelet on 13 April 2015. It was published in the Diario Oficial de la República de Chile on 21 April 2015 and took effect on 22 October 2015.

Chile's civil union provisions enable couples to claim pension benefits and inherit property if their civil partner dies as well as more easily co-own property and make medical decisions for one another. All disputes and conflicts involving civil partners are dealt with by the Family Courts. The government estimated at the time of the law going into effect that some two million cohabiting couples could have their unions legally recognized. In the day following the law going into effect, approximately 1,600 couples signed up to register their unions. The first same-sex civil union on Easter Island was performed for Petero Avaka Tukuone and Aru Pate Hotus, a Mapuche-Rapa Nui couple, in November 2015.

On 1 December 2016, the Chamber of Deputies unanimously approved, with six abstentions, a bill granting civil partners five days marriage leave, similar to newly married couples. The bill was approved by the Senate in October 2017 in a unanimous 15–0 vote. The law took effect on 8 November 2017.

Statistics
31,098 couples entered into a civil union between 2015 and 2019. Of these, 21% were same-sex couples (3,310 female couples and 3,271 male couples). From October to December 2015, 28.7% of the civil unions registered were of same-sex couples; however, in the following months, this number declined and stabilized to around 20%.

Civil unions represented around 10% of the total unions registered in the country. Between 2016 and 2019, 248,567 marriages and 22,951 civil unions were performed. In the same period, 5,950 same-sex civil unions were registered, accounting for 2.14% of all the legal unions registered.

Most civil unions were performed in the Santiago Metropolitan Region (44%) followed by the Valparaíso Region (14%). Considering population, the region with the largest number of civil unions is Antofagasta (7.6 per 10,000 inhabitants), while the lowest is Araucanía (2.0 per 10,000 inhabitants). The Metropolitan Region has also the largest share of same-sex civil unions compared to opposite-sex unions (27%), followed by O'Higgins (22%) and Valparaíso (20%). On the other hand, Aysén has the lowest share of same-sex unions (8%), followed by Los Ríos (11%), Coquimbo (12%) and Magallanes (12%).

Same-sex marriage

Legal challenges 
The first attempts to legalize same-sex marriage in Chile were made after the ban was legally challenged in different national and international courts in the early 2010s. The Constitutional Court of Chile heard arguments on 28 July 2011 regarding the constitutionality of article 102 of the Civil Code, which banned same-sex marriage, but ruled in a 9–1 vote on November 3 that the ban was not unconstitutional.

In 2012, a lawsuit was filed with the Inter-American Court of Human Rights arguing that Chile's same-sex marriage ban violated the American Convention on Human Rights and Chile's international obligations. The Piñera Government stated its opposition to the suit in 2013.

On 10 June 2016, the Third Chamber of the Court of Appeals of Santiago rejected another lawsuit filed by the LGBT group MOVILH. The court ruled that as Chilean legislation did not permit same-sex marriages, the civil registry could not marry same-sex couples. It also held that opening marriage to same-sex couples was a decision for Congress and not for the courts.

In December 2018, the Supreme Court of Chile recognized marriage as a fundamental right, in a case legal experts suggested may pave the way for same-sex marriage. Shortly after the ruling, a same-sex couple filed suit against the ban on same-sex marriage, arguing that it was unconstitutional and a violation of human rights. On 26 April 2019, after the Supreme Court referred the case back to the Santiago Court of Appeals due to a probable constitutional violation, the latter ruled that denying the couple a marriage license was not illegal. The plaintiffs appealed the ruling to the Supreme Court. However, the appeal was not accepted.

Agreement with the Inter-American Commission of Human Rights
Even though some minor presidential candidates had announced their support for same-sex marriage, Michelle Bachelet was the first major candidate to declared her support in the lead up to the November 2013 presidential elections. On 11 April 2013, she announced her intention to legalize same-sex marriage if elected president. Bachelet, who was previously been president of Chile between 2006 and 2010, won the election on 15 December 2013.

After Bachelet's inauguration in March 2014, MOVILH announced that they would seek an amicable solution to the lawsuit presented to the Inter-American Court of Human Rights in 2012. On 10 December 2014, a group of senators from various parties presented a bill to allow same-sex marriage and adoption to the National Congress of Chile, with the support of MOVILH. On 17 February 2015, lawyers representing the government and MOVILH met to discuss the case, and the government announced that they would drop their opposition to same-sex marriage. A formal agreement between the two parties and the Inter-American Commission of Human Rights was signed in April 2015. 

On 1 July 2016, the government announced that it would begin consultations on a same-sex marriage bill in September 2016, with the aim of finalizing it by mid-2017, and said it views a ban on same-sex marriage as a "human rights violation". President Bachelet stated before a United Nations General Assembly panel in September 2016 that the Chilean Government would submit a same-sex marriage bill to Congress "in the first half of 2017." In June 2017, she announced in a speech to Congress that the bill would be introduced in the second half of 2017. It was later confirmed that the bill would grant married same-sex couples equal adoption rights. The bill was introduced to Congress on 28 August 2017, before being submitted to the Senate on 5 September and referred to the Constitution, Legislation, Justice and Regulation committee.

On 19 November 2017, Chile held parliamentary elections and the first round of the presidential election. According to newspaper La Tercera and LGBT activists, a majority of the newly elected Chamber of Deputies and Senate were in favor of same-sex marriage. The Senate's Constitution, Legislation, Justice, and Regulation committee began examining the bill on 27 November 2017. Two days prior, an estimated 100,000 people marched in Santiago in favor of the bill's passage. Participants included many lawmakers and diplomats, including presidential candidate Alejandro Guillier.

On 17 December 2017, Sebastián Piñera was re-elected president. Though personally opposed to same-sex marriage, Piñera said he would respect the April 2015 agreement with the Inter-American Commission of Human Rights, saying that "Chile's international commitments will be fulfilled". In the wake of a January 2018 Inter-American Court of Human Rights ruling requiring signatory nations to the American Convention on Human Rights to recognize same-sex marriage, MOVILH urged Piñera to implement and abide by the decision. In early March 2018, a spokesperson for the Piñera Administration announced that passing the same-sex marriage bill would not be a priority, but that the Piñera Government would not veto or oppose it. In early April 2018, the Inter-American Commission of Human Rights summoned the Chilean Government to a meeting to discuss the status of the measures included in the agreement reached in April 2015. The meeting took place in the Dominican Republic on 3 May 2018. The government informed the Commission that it would continue to respect the April 2015 agreement. On 17 May 2018, the International Day Against Homophobia, Transphobia and Biphobia, Piñera signed the agreement and pledged to continue the work of the previous administration in legalizing same-sex marriage.

Parliamentary debate and approval 

Committee debate on the same-sex marriage bill resumed on 9 January 2019, and continued in May. In May 2019, Senate president Jaime Quintana said that the same-sex marriage bill, along with a bill permitting same-sex couples to adopt, would have priority in the Senate agenda. In July 2019, upon assuming his role as chairman of the Constitution Committee, Senator Felipe Harboe began fast-tracking the procedure of the same-sex marriage bill, as opposition parties announced their intention to push for debate in Congress before going into recess in February 2020. On 15 January 2020, the bill was approved at its first reading in the Senate by 22 votes to 16 and was sent to the Senate Constitutional Commission. In October 2020, it was reported that the commission had approved 29 of the articles in the bill, with 27 remaining to be approved.

On 1 June 2021, during his last annual address to the National Congress, Piñera announced that his government would support the bill and place urgency on bringing it forward to a vote. On 21 July 2021, the Senate approved the legislation by 28 votes to 14. The bill then moved to  the Chamber of Deputies. On 13 October 2021, the bill was approved by the Constitutional Committee of the Chamber of Deputies, and on 2 November 2021 the bill was approved by the Finance Committee of the Chamber. On 23 November 2021, the Chamber of Deputies approved an amended version of the bill by 101 votes to 30. As it was modified by the Chamber of Deputies, the Senate Constitutional Committee decided to send the bill to a joint committee of both houses. On 6 December, the joint committee voted 7–2 in favor of the Chamber version of the bill with modifications, including a compromise provision that spouses of transgender people wishing to change their name and legal gender should first be consulted as to whether they wish to seek a divorce, which was criticized by MOVILH as "transphobic".

Finally, the joint committee's bill was passed by both houses on 7 December 2021, with the Senate voting 21–8 with 3 absentions and the Chamber voting 82–20 with 2 absentions. The bill was signed by Piñera on 9 December, saying that "true freedom is built recognizing each other as equals in dignity and rights". The bill was published in the Diario Oficial de la República de Chile on 10 December, and took effect 90 days later (i.e. 10 March 2022).

Efforts to include same-sex unions in the constitution
In October 2020, Chile voted in a national plebiscite to rewrite its constitution. In a May 2021 election, voters elected the members of the Constitutional Convention, the body tasked with writing the new constitution. LGBT groups are hopeful that same-sex marriage and adoption rights for same-sex couples will be enshrined in this new constitution, particularly as the right-wing governing coalition Chile Vamos failed to reach the third of members needed to veto in the Convention.

Attempts to ban same-sex unions
In response to the proposed legislation to recognize same-sex unions and potential legal battles brewing in the country's Constitutional Court, members of the Independent Democrat Union (UDI) introduced a constitutional amendment on 11 August 2011 seeking to define marriage as the "union of a man and a woman". The bill was not brought to a vote.

On 16 June 2016, two UDI MPs introduced a bill to amend the Constitution of Chile to ban same-sex marriage and prohibit same-sex couples from adopting. The measure was not successful.

Public opinion

An April 2009 poll concluded that only 33.2% of Chileans were in favor of allowing same-sex couples to marry, with 65.2% opposed. However, support among young people was much higher: according to a study by the National Youth Institute of Chile, 56% of people aged between 15 and 29 supported same-sex marriage, while 51.3% supported adoption by same-sex couples.

A July 2011 nationwide CEP (Centro de Estudios Públicos) poll found that 52% of Chileans were in favor of granting legal rights to same-sex unions: 18% supported granting civil marriage to same-sex couples, while 34% preferred giving same-sex couples a "legal union". When the question was slightly rephrased, 57% of Chileans were against same-sex marriage where "the same rights as a heterosexual couple are guaranteed" and 27% in favor, while support for a "legal union" of same-sex couples was higher at 35%, with 57% against. In all questions, support for same-sex unions was higher among the younger and better educated. In the case of the adoption of children by a lesbian couple, 24% were in favor and 61% against. Support was lower for male gay couples: 20% in favor and 64% against.

An August 2012 poll by Radio Cooperativa – Imaginaccion found that 54.9% of Chileans supported same-sex marriage, while 40.7% were opposed. A Pew Research Center survey conducted the following year showed that 46% of Chileans supported same-sex marriage, while 42% were opposed.

According to a 2014 survey by the Chilean pollster Cadem Plaza Pública, 55% of Chileans were in favor of same-sex marriage, whilst 39% were against. A poll carried out in September 2015 by the same pollster found that 60% of Chileans supported same-sex marriage, whereas opposition was at 36%. The pollster's 2016 survey found 61% support and 36% opposition. A further poll carried out in July 2017 by the same organization showed that support stood at 61% and opposition at 32%.

A 2016 International Civic and Citizenship Education Study poll, published in April 2018, found that 79% of Chilean eighth graders (13–14-year-olds) supported same-sex marriage. The study also included four other Latin American countries, of which Chile had the highest level of support: Mexico was at 78%, Colombia at 63%, Peru at 48%, and the Dominican Republic at 38%. Chile's support was a 21% increase from 2009.

The 2017 AmericasBarometer showed that 59% of Chileans supported same-sex marriage.

A poll conducted for Radio Cooperativa – Imaginaccion between 24 and 27 August 2017 found that 62.2% of Chileans supported same-sex marriage, while 34.8% were against. In the same poll, 47% supported adoption by same-sex couples, while 51.2% were opposed.

A poll carried out by Cadem Plaza Pública in April 2018 put support for same-sex marriage at 64% and opposition at 34%. 2% were unsure or had refused to answer. Support and opposition to same-sex adoption both stood at 49%. In 2019, the pollster showed that support had increased to 66%, with 54% also in favor of permitting same-sex couples to adopt. In 2022, support for same-sex marriage reached 82% and for adoption rights 70%.

See also 
LGBT rights in Chile
Recognition of same-sex unions in the Americas
 Same-sex union court cases
 Polygamy in Mapuche culture

Notes

References 

LGBT rights in Chile
Chile
2022 in LGBT history